Metachroma is a genus of leaf beetles in the subfamily Eumolpinae. It is distributed from Ontario, Canada to Mendoza, Argentina, including the Antilles (where a large number of species occur). It has also been suggested that the genus extends to the Pacific Islands, though this is not confirmed. There are about 140 described species in Metachroma, 40 of which are found north of Mexico. An extinct species is also known from the Eocene of the United States.

Species

The following five species from Cuba described by Suffrian in 1866, some of which were renamed by Clavareau in 1914, were considered doubtful by Doris Holmes Blake in her 1970 review of the genus. However, since she was not able to examine the original specimens for them, they remained unknown to her.
 Metachroma cubaecola Clavareau, 1914 (= Metachroma puncticolle Suffrian, 1866)
 Metachroma laeviasculum Suffrian, 1866
 Metachroma lituratum Suffrian, 1866
 Metachroma sordidum Suffrian, 1866
 Metachroma suffriani Clavareau, 1914 (= Metachroma suturale Suffrian, 1866)

References

Further reading

 
 
 
 
 
 
 
 
 

Eumolpinae
Chrysomelidae genera
Beetles of North America
Beetles of Central America
Beetles of South America
Taxa named by Louis Alexandre Auguste Chevrolat